Garten is a German surname, translating as garden. It can refer to:

People
Jeffrey Garten, an American politician
Ina Garten, an American author
Al Garten, a football coach
Ariel Garten, a Canadian artist and scientist
Joel Garten, an American musician

Gardens
Englischer Garten, a garden in Munich, Germany
Britzer Garten, a garden in Berlin, Germany
Großer Garten, a garden in Dresden, Germany

Zoos
Zürich Zoologischer Garten, a zoo in Switzerland
Zoologischer Garten Berlin, a zoo in Berlin, Germany

Other
Garten, an island in Trøndelag county, Norway
Garten, West Virginia, a small community in the United States
Boat of Garten, a village in Scotland
Scholz Garten, a bar in Texas
Gartan, a village in County Donegal, Ireland (often misspelled as Garten)